The 1994 Malta International Football Tournament  (known as the Rothmans Tournament for sponsorship reasons) was the seventh edition of the Malta International Tournament. The competition was played between 8 and 12 February, with games hosted at the National Stadium in Ta' Qali.

Matches

Winner

Statistics

Goalscorers

See also 
China Cup
Cyprus International Football Tournament

References 

1993–94 in Maltese football
1993–94 in Slovenian football
1994 in Russian football
1994 in Icelandic football
1994